Hugh Eldon Wild (April 15, 1918 – February 18, 2013) was a brigadier general in the United States Air Force.

Biography
Wild was born in Elmwood, Wisconsin, in 1918. He would attend the University of Iowa and George Washington University.

Career
Wild joined the United States Army Air Corps in 1940. He served in World War II, participating in conflicts including the Philippines Campaign (1944–45). Following the war he was assigned to the Strategic Air Command. During the Vietnam War he was in command of the 834th Air Division. Following his service in the war he was given command of the 322d Air Division and the 435th Military Airlift Support Wing. His retirement was effective as of February 1, 1970.

Awards he has received include the Legion of Merit with oak leaf cluster, the Distinguished Flying Cross with oak leaf cluster, the Air Medal with three oak leaf clusters, and the Army Commendation Medal.

References

People from Pierce County, Wisconsin
Military personnel from Wisconsin
United States Air Force generals
Recipients of the Legion of Merit
Recipients of the Distinguished Flying Cross (United States)
Recipients of the Air Medal
United States Air Force personnel of the Vietnam War
United States Army Air Forces pilots of World War II
University of Iowa alumni
George Washington University alumni
1918 births
2013 deaths